DC's Stargirl, or simply Stargirl, is an American superhero television series created by Geoff Johns that premiered on streaming service DC Universe. It is based on the DC Comics superhero Courtney Whitmore, created by Johns and Lee Moder. The series follows high school student Courtney Whitmore who discovers the cosmic staff originally wielded by Starman and becomes the inspiration for a new generation of superheroes who become the new incarnation of the Justice Society of America.

DC Universe ordered the series in July 2018. Brec Bassinger was cast as Courtney Whitmore that September, with additional castings for her family members, the Justice Society of America, and the Injustice Society of America through February 2019. Filming for the series began in March 2019 in the Atlanta metropolitan area. Stargirl premiered on DC Universe on May 18, 2020; the season consists of 13 episodes and also aired the following day on the broadcast network The CW. In July 2020, the series was renewed for a second season, subtitled Summer School which premiered on August 10, 2021, exclusively on The CW. In May 2021, the series was renewed for a third season, subtitled Frenemies which premiered on August 31, 2022. In October 2022, it was announced that the third season would be its last.

Ahead of the series premiere, characters from the series were featured in a cameo during the Arrowverse crossover "Crisis on Infinite Earths" through archive footage. It established Stargirl as existing on a parallel Earth to the Arrowverse. The show has received positive reviews from critics.

Premise
One decade after most members of the Justice Society of America (JSA) are killed in battle against the Injustice Society of America (ISA), Courtney Whitmore, a high school student who moved to Blue Valley, discovers the Cosmic Staff of Starman and learns that her stepfather Pat Dugan used to be his sidekick. After encountering the remnants of the ISA which now include the mysterious Dragon King and his daughter Cindy Burman, Courtney becomes the inspiration for a whole new generation of superheroes and recruits Yolanda Montez, Rick Tyler, and Beth Chapel.

In season two, Stargirl and the JSA contend with the re-emergence of former ISA member Shade and a mysterious entity known as Eclipso, who works with Cindy to create a new ISA called Injustice Unlimited. When Eclipso breaks free from Cindy's control, the JSA works to stop him and finds new allies in Jennie-Lynn Scott, Jakeem Williams, Thunderbolt, a rescued Charles McNider, a revived Starman, and former ISA members Solomon Grundy, Sportsmaster, and Tigress.

In season three, the heroes and villains living in Blue Valley become embroiled in a murder mystery after former ISA member Steven Sharpe is found dead, while someone has been spying on them with cameras placed all over town. It turns out that a reconstituted Icicle was responsible as he is in league with the JSA's old enemy Ultra-Humanite and Dragon King.

Cast and characters

 Brec Bassinger as Courtney Whitmore / Stargirl:A high school student from Los Angeles who finds a powerful weapon, the Cosmic Staff and becomes the superheroine Stargirl. As Stargirl, she also becomes the leader of the second incarnation of the Justice Society of America (JSA). In preparation for the role, Bassinger did not look at the character's previous portrayals by Britt Irvin on Smallville and Sarah Grey on Legends of Tomorrow because they were depicted as "older, more mature version[s]" of Stargirl. Bassinger added that the series follows the comic Stars and S.T.R.I.P.E. more "in that she's young, high school, naive, which I wanted to bring that into this version of Stargirl." Maizie Smith portrays a five-year old Courtney.
 Yvette Monreal as Yolanda Montez / Wildcat II:A once popular student at Blue Valley High until a scandal made her an outcast and a disgrace to her Catholic parents. A skilled boxer, she becomes one of Courtney's friends and a member of the new JSA as the new Wildcat. 
 Anjelika Washington as Beth Chapel / Doctor Mid-Nite II: A social reject and nerd who becomes one of Courtney's friends and a member of the new JSA as the new Doctor Mid-Nite.
 Cameron Gellman as Rick Tyler / Hourman II:A high school delinquent with anger issues and the son of the original Hourman whose parents were killed in a staged car accident when he was seven. He becomes one of Courtney's friends and a member of the new JSA as the new Hourman. Boston Pierce portrays a 7-year-old Rick.
 Trae Romano as Mike Dugan: Pat Dugan's son and Courtney's stepbrother.
 Jake Austin Walker as Henry King Jr. (season 1; guest season 2):A student at Blue Valley High as well as its star football player. He later develops psionic powers after experiencing emotional distress following his father becoming comatose. His deceased mother was Sylvester Pemberton's sister Merry.
 Meg DeLacy as Cindy Burman / Shiv:The daughter of the Dragon King, girlfriend of Henry King Jr. and the most popular student at Blue Valley High with enhanced abilities and wields wrist blades from her skin. While she is the school's cheerleading captain, she is determined to follow in her father's footsteps. In pursuit of this, she acquired a powerful suit of armor and a flame-throwing staff. In the second season, she teams up with Eclipso and forms a new ISA called Injustice Unlimited. In the third and final season, she wants to change her ways and joins the new JSA. Later, Cindy starts to manifest a reptilian form due to her father's experiments on her throughout her childhood.
 Neil Jackson as Jordan Mahkent / Icicle (season 1; recurring season 3; guest season 2):The leader of the Injustice Society of America (ISA), an "astute" businessman with the power of cryokinesis and founder of a firm called The American Dream that is responsible for the revitalization of Blue Valley. Jackson initially thought "Icicle" was "a silly name" and made the character sound "like a My Little Pony", but Johns' pitch helped make the character credible for Jackson. In the third and final season, Icicle reconstitutes himself after he was shattered by Mike Dugan in the past year. He then formed an alliance with the JSA's old enemy Ultra-Humanite and Dragon King; making plans for his son to defeat the latter and become a hero while the former steals Starman's body to run for president.
 Christopher James Baker as Henry King Sr. / Brainwave (season 1; guest season 2):A member of the ISA with psionic abilities, the father of Henry King Jr. and a successful neurosurgeon at Blue Valley Medical Center. Baker stated that Henry King Sr. was the "mask" of Brainwave, as opposed to the other way around, believing Brainwave "is the true being."
 Amy Smart as Barbara Whitmore: Courtney's mother and Pat Dugan's wife who strives to balance her work and home life. After her marriage to Pat, she initially serves as a surrogate mother to her stepson Mike and also to Courtney's JSA teammates after discovering Pat and Courtney's secrets.
 Luke Wilson as Pat Dugan / S.T.R.I.P.E.:Courtney's stepfather, the former sidekick to Starman, and a mechanic who owns a repair garage where he stores a 15-foot robotic vehicle of his own creation made from spare car parts. Pat serves as a reluctant mentor and father figure to Courtney and her JSA teammates while using a garage called The Pit Stop as a front. Despite his superheroics, Pat wants to provide a normal life for his family.
 Hunter Sansone as Cameron Mahkent: A student at Blue Valley High, aspiring artist, and the son of Jordan Mahkent who was born with cryokinetic powers like his father. He and Courtney share a mutual crush. In the third and final season, Cameron learns the Justice Society's identities and that they're responsible for his father's apparent death. Roger Dale Floyd portrays a younger Cameron.
 Nick Tarabay as Eclipso (season 2; guest season 1): An entity trapped inside a black diamond that Cindy obtains. He plans to become a god by feeding on the negativity and darkness of the people on Earth. Milo Stein portrays Eclipso's form of young Bruce.
 Alkoya Brunson as Jakeem Williams / Jakeem Thunder (season 3; guest season 2):  A gamer who is Mike Dugan's friend, the younger brother of Jenny Williams, and the current keeper of Thunderbolt's pen.
 Neil Hopkins as Lawrence "Crusher" Crock / Sportsmaster (season 3; recurring season 1; guest season 2):A member of the ISA who wields sports-themed weapons and believes that all of his targets are just part of a game to win. Crusher is the owner of a gym in Blue Valley called Ripped City, is married to Paula Brooks, and is the father of Artemis Crock. In season two, he breaks out of prison twice. In season three, he moves in next door to the Whitmore-Dugans.
 Joy Osmanski as Paula Brooks / Tigress (season 3; recurring season 1; guest season 2):A member of the ISA who hunts the world's most dangerous humans. She is a gym teacher at Blue Valley High, the wife of "Crusher" Crock, and mother of Artemis Crock. In season two, she breaks out of prison twice. In season three, she moves in next door to the Whitmore-Dugans.
 Joel McHale as Sylvester Pemberton / Starman and Gerard Shugel / Ultra-Humanite (season 3; guest season 1; recurring season 2):A member of the original JSA who used an anti gravity Cosmic Staff invented by scientist Ted Knight that Courtney later finds. In the present, Ultra-Humanite forms an alliance with Icicle and Dragon King before transplanting his brain into Sylvester Pemberton's body to manipulate Stargirl and her JSA into crippling themselves, and Dragon King's brain into Ultra-Humanite's albino gorilla body for him to "defeat" as Starman alongside Jordan's son. From there, he intends to run for president as a mouthpiece for Icicle to spread his ideals.

Episodes

Season 1 (2020)

Season 2: Summer School (2021)

Season 3: Frenemies (2022)

Production

Development
In July 2018, DC Universe gave a series order to Stargirl, consisting of thirteen episodes. The pilot was written by Geoff Johns, who also executive produces alongside Greg Berlanti, Sarah Schechter, and Melissa Carter (who is co-showrunner with Johns). Production companies involved with the series are Mad Ghost Productions, Berlanti Productions, and Warner Bros. Television. The series was said to be a "reimagining" of Stargirl. The CW renewed the series for a second season in July 2020, resulting in the series moving exclusively to the network as a CW original series. The second season is subtitled Summer School. Ahead of the second-season premiere, The CW renewed the series for a third season in May 2021. The renewal allowed the series to be co-financed by HBO Max, part of a larger deal between The CW and HBO Max. The third season is subtitled Frenemies. In October 2022, The CW announced the show would  end with the third season and set date for the finale on December 7, 2022.

Writing
Johns described Stargirl as having a similar tone to 1980s films such as E.T. the Extra-Terrestrial and Back to the Future. The start of the series sees the deaths of the original members of the Justice Society of America (JSA). With the younger generation taking up their mantle, Johns said their "paths aren't complete. They don't know where they're going to be or what they're going to be. And so, there's all sorts of mistakes they can make and choices they can make, and who knows what their ultimate destiny will be?... It makes for a lot of fun and a lot of unpredictability." The members of the Injustice Society mirrors those on the JSA team, with Johns teasing that just about everyone who has been a member of the Injustice Society in the comics would appear in the series. Speaking to classic JSA members such as Alan Scott and Jay Garrick, Johns called them the "elderly statesmen" and that they "are spoken of and they exist in the JSA" with "their legacies... felt throughout the show". There were also "plans in the future for things". For the first season, star Brec Bassinger felt the original Doctor Mid-Nite, Charles McNider would have "a significant role to play", while Johns added the season would establish the Seven Soldiers of Victory as the first superhero team before the JSA and explore the history of the Cosmic Staff. Regarding the death of Henry King, Jr., Johns revealed that he always "had a finite story", going "from this almost unlikeable bully to possibly a redeemed hero, and then ultimately die protecting his new friends when facing his father, while also learning a lesson that Courtney imparted on him and apologizing to Yolanda." Johns spoke with actor Jake Austin Walker before he signed on to play the character to inform him of this and discuss the character with him. The character's return in the season one finale with his father pretending to be his son was done to subvert the "nobody ever dies" superhero trope.

Yolanda Montez's struggle with killing Brainwave was "a big part of season 2". Johns added that compared to Rick Tyler, who is "starting to kind of turn a corner" after overcoming his anger for his parents' death, Yolanda is "turning the other way... She's lost in her own world, thinking about what she has done" since she was not ready to kill someone, unlike Rick. Additionally, more motivations from the surviving members of the Injustice Society are explored in the second season.

Bassinger teased that the third season would feature a murder mystery.

Casting
Brec Bassinger was cast as Courtney Whitmore / Stargirl in September 2018. Johns called the casting of Stargirl a difficult process, auditioning hundreds of actresses for the role. On why Bassinger was perfect for the role, Johns said: "Immediately... I knew she was Courtney. She has the humor, she has the enthusiasm, the energy, the innate optimism, and Brec really embodies who Stargirl is". The following roles were cast in November: Anjelika Washington as Beth Chapel / Doctor Mid-Nite, Yvette Monreal as Yolanda Montez / Wildcat, and Christopher James Baker as Henry King / Brainwave. In January 2019, Luke Wilson was cast as Pat Dugan / S.T.R.I.P.E. Amy Smart joined the cast as Barbara Whitmore in February, along with Neil Jackson as Jordan Mahkent / Icicle, Trae Romano as Mike Dugan, Hunter Sansone as Cameron, and Cameron Gellman as Rick Tyler / Hourman. Also Jake Austin Walker was cast as Henry King Jr. and Meg DeLacy cast as Cindy Burman.

The following members of the Justice Society of America were cast in December 2018: Joel McHale as Sylvester Pemberton / Starman, Lou Ferrigno Jr. as Rex Tyler / Hourman, Brian Stapf as Ted Grant / Wildcat, and Henry Thomas as Charles McNider / Doctor Mid-Nite. As well, Joy Osmanski was cast as Paula Brooks / Tigress, Neil Hopkins was cast as Lawrence "Crusher" Crock / Sportsmaster, and Nelson Lee was cast as Dr. Ito / Dragon King, members of the Injustice Society. In April 2019, Hina Khan was cast as Anaya Bowin. In October 2020, Nick Tarabay joined the cast as a series regular as Eclipso while Jonathan Cake was cast as Shade and Ysa Penarejo was cast in an undisclosed role in recurring capacities for the second season, while Jim Gaffigan was cast as the voice of Thunderbolt. The following month, Alkoya Brunson was cast in a recurring role as Jakeem Thunder. In February 2021, John Wesley Shipp was revealed to be reprising his role as Jay Garrick from The Flash, albeit as an alternate version. Alex Collins replaces Thomas as Doctor Mid-Nite for the second season. Hopkins and Osmanski were promoted to series regulars for the third season in August 2021, following their recurring roles in the first season and guest appearance in the second. McHale was also promoted to a series regular in October for the third season following his guest appearances in the first two seasons.

In March 2022, Tim Gabriel was cast as Todd Rice / Obsidian. In May 2022, Seth Green joined the cast in recasting to succeed Gaffigan who voiced Thunderbolt last season. The third season trailer confirmed the return of Eric Goins as Steven Sharpe / Gambler, who appeared in the first but was absent from the second.

Design
Costume designer LJ Shannon "tried to stay as true to the [comics] lore as possible" in her designs. Each of the costumes are "utilitarian" with individual looks. Johns described Doctor Mid-Nite's as "[a] little steampunky" with canvas and leather and Hourman's as "a little more slick". Legacy Effects created a practical S.T.R.I.P.E. for use during filming.

Filming
Filming began in March 2019 with Glen Winter directing the pilot. Christopher Manley and Scott Peck were directors of photography on the series. Filming occurs throughout the Atlanta metropolitan area, including: Marietta, Virginia–Highland, Duluth, Lithia Springs, Dallas, Marietta Square, West End, Westlake High School, the Atlanta Center for Medical Research, Campbell Middle School, Paulding County, Smyrna, Arbor Place Mall, Vinings, Mableton, and Douglas County High School. Walter Garcia serves as the series' stunt coordinator and second-unit director. He was hired to help Stargirl's staff "have a personality and be alive when she fights with it". The series continued to film in Atlanta for the second season, with filming beginning by October 28, 2020.

Visual effects
Zoic Studios provided visual effects for the series. According to Johns, Stargirl was the first Warner Bros. Television series to use previsualization (a process most commonly used by feature films) for their effects scenes. Previsualization was handled by The Third Floor, Inc. Johns brought his experience working on the films Wonder Woman (2017), Aquaman (2018), and Shazam! (2019) to help the series have visuals not "seen in superhero shows before".

Music
Pinar Toprak is a composer for the series.

Release
Stargirl premiered on DC Universe on May 18, 2020, and consists of 13 episodes. The series was originally intended to premiere on May 11, seven days before its official release. The series is released in 4K Ultra HD on DC Universe.

In November 2019, The CW announced to broadcast each episode the day after it premieres on the streaming service, with each episode available to stream on The CW's online platforms after its broadcast. Stargirl started airing on The CW on May 19, 2020, at 8 pm. Some episodes have content removed when they air on The CW to allow for the network's commercials, notably approximately eight minutes in each of the first two episodes. DC Universe streams the full episodes, and Johns said starting with the third episode, both releases are "almost identical". The series release plans shifted and it stayed in post-production longer to accommodate the broadcast on The CW to accomplish the adjustments that had to be made.

Scenes removed in the first episode from The CW broadcast included: establishing shots of Barbara Whitmore's new job, and Pat's auto shop; an interaction between Courtney and Cindy Burman in the halls of Blue Valley High School that Alex Zalben of Decider said was "clear set-up for later" but helped strengthen Courtney's emotional arc; and Mark Ashworth's scenes as "a mysterious, extremely creepy bearded janitor", which Zalben said was more of "a fun Easter egg that will pay dividends down the road"; and Courtney finding a newspaper article about Starman and Stripesy. The first season became available on HBO Max on December 1, 2020.

The second season of the series airs exclusively on The CW, and premiered on August 10, 2021. The season debuted on HBO Max on December 10, 2021. The third season premiered on August 31, 2022.

Marketing
On December 7, 2019, a teaser trailer was released. In early August 2020, The CW released several posters for its Arrowverse series with the superheroes wearing face masks, including Stargirl, with all posters having the caption "Real Heroes Wear Masks". This marketing tactic was used to "stress the importance of wearing masks while out in public to help stop the spread of" COVID-19.

Reception

Ratings

Season 1
The following table represents viewership data for each episode's airing on The CW, as DC Universe did not release viewership information. The pilot episode was tied for the second-best series debut on The CW for the 2019–20 television season with Nancy Drew after Batwoman, and was the best summer series premiere on the network since Whose Line Is It Anyway? season nine in 2013. Through the first seven episodes of the season, Stargirl was averaging a 0.2 rating for adults 18–49 and close to 1 million initial viewers per episode, which was "on par" with The CW's Arrowverse series.

Season 2

Season 3

Critical response
On Rotten Tomatoes, the first season has an approval rating of 89% based on 38 reviews, with an average rating of 7.61/10. The website's critical consensus reads, "A stellar series perfect for anyone looking for a little hope, Stargirl is delightful fun the whole family can enjoy." On Metacritic it has a weighted average score of 68 out of 100 based on 8 reviews, indicating "generally favorable reviews".

Brian Lowry of CNN described the series as "hardly seeks to reinvent the wheel, or even expand the mold. Still, its mix of solid characters, clever writing and youthful exuberance casts a brighter light than most." Daniel Fienberg of The Hollywood Reporter gave a review stating "Derivative, but should fill the superhero-origin-story-shaped hole in your heart" and wrote, "The result is that a show that is frequently derivative to the point of distraction might actually fill a need for viewers able to concentrate on its occasional charms until better superhero shows return."

On Rotten Tomatoes, the second season holds an approval rating of 100% based on 5 reviews, with an average rating of 8.2/10.

Awards and nominations

Cancelled spin-off
After the series' cancellation, it was revealed that a spin-off revolving around Infinity Inc. was planned and that it would have followed the Shade, Jennie, and Todd searching for the other offspring of the original JSA members and help them with their potential abilities.

Arrowverse

Stargirl and her team were briefly introduced in the Arrowverse crossover "Crisis on Infinite Earths" in January 2020, through archive footage from "The Justice Society" episode. Stargirl is set on a new Earth-2, created during the crossover. Stargirl from the pre-Crisis Earth-1 had previously appeared in three episodes of season two of Legends of Tomorrow, portrayed by Sarah Grey, between October 2016 and February 2017.

Regarding any proper crossovers with the Arrowverse, Johns and Bassinger were keen on the idea. In April 2020, Johns said, "right now the main concern is making sure that this show is great, that these characters are great, that they have their own stories and they get the proper screen time and the proper episodes to develop on their own. So hopefully in the future we can do something fun, but the first season is all about making sure that Stargirl is the best show it can possibly be". Bassinger added that there had already been preliminary discussion about crossing over with The Flash, and she was hopeful to be able to crossover with Melissa Benoist on Supergirl. John Wesley Shipp reprised his role as an alternate version of Jay Garrick from The Flash. Johns said Shipp's appearance helped connect "our universe directly with the other shows, and also shows that were part of a grander universe. It opens up the door to opportunities for us to eventually interact with those [Arrowverse] characters, and that was important."

In September 2022, Bassinger filmed material for the fourth season of the HBO Max series Titans; that series exists on Earth-9 of the live multiverse.

Notes

References

External links
 
 

2020 American television series debuts
2022 American television series endings
2020s American drama television series
2020s American high school television series
2020s American science fiction television series
American superhero television series
American action adventure television series
American fantasy drama television series
American fantasy television series
The CW original programming
DC Universe (streaming service) original programming
English-language television shows
Robots in television
Superheroine television shows
Teen superhero television series
Television series about families
Television series about teenagers
Television series by Warner Bros. Television Studios
Television shows based on DC Comics
Television shows filmed in Atlanta
Television shows filmed in Georgia (U.S. state)
Television shows set in Nebraska
Television series created by Geoff Johns